New Jersey's 10th congressional district is an urban congressional district in the U.S. state of New Jersey. The district consists of portions of Essex, Hudson and Union counties, and includes the cities of Newark and Orange. The district is majority African American and has been represented in Congress by Democrat Donald Payne Jr. since November 2012.

The district was previously represented by Donald Payne Jr.'s father, Donald M. Payne Sr., from 1989 to 2012, and became vacant as a result of the elder Payne's death on March 6, 2012. On November 15, 2012, Donald Payne Jr. was sworn into office and on January 3, 2013, he began serving his first full term. The 10th congressional district (together with the 9th) was created starting with the 58th United States Congress in 1903, based on redistricting predicated on the results of the 1900 census.

Counties and municipalities in the district

For the 118th and successive Congresses (based on redistricting following the 2020 Census), the district contains all or portions of three counties and 18 municipalities.

Essex County: (9)
Caldwell, East Orange, Essex Fells, Irvington, Montclair (part; also 11th), Newark (part; also 8th), Orange, Verona, and West Orange

Hudson County: (1)
Jersey City (part; also 8th)

Union County: (8)
Cranford, Garwood, Hillside, Kenilworth, Linden (part; also 7th), Roselle, Roselle Park, and Union Township

Recent statewide election results

Recent election results

1988

1990

1992

1994

1996

1998

2000

2002

2004

2006

2008

2010

2012

2014

2016

2018

2020

2022

List of members representing the district

References

 Congressional Biographical Directory of the United States 1774–present
 New Jersey 2011 Congressional Redistricting Commission

10
Essex County, New Jersey
Hudson County, New Jersey
Union County, New Jersey
Constituencies established in 1903
1903 establishments in New Jersey